Stebbing Studios is a recording studio in Auckland, New Zealand. Artists who have had their work recorded over the years, include: Ray Columbus & The Invaders, Bill & Boyd, Gary Havoc & The Hurricanes, The Human Instinct, and Waves.

Background
The studio was founded by Eldred Stebbing, who also founded Zodiac Records. He originally set up a recording studio in the basement of the family home in the Auckland suburb of Herne Bay. He built the Stebbing Recording Centre in 1970, which is located in Jervois Rd, where it is still in operation today.

1970s
In 1970, they were the first to have eight track recording facilities. 

During 1974 - 1975, John Hanlon recorded at the studio. In December 1974, Dragon recorded their Scented Gardens for the Blind album there. Also during 1974 - 1975, Human Instinct recorded tracks for their Peg Leg album. Unfortunately the master tapes went missing, and weren't found until more than a couple of decades later. Australian Jazz musician Don Burrows had his album The Tasman Connection recorded there, which was released on the Cherry Pie label in 1976.

1980s
By 1981, Stebbing Studios were one of four New Zealand recording studios with twenty four track recording facilities.

1990s
In 1999, the studio entered into a CD production venture with Hargon International, but then bought them out. They invested $10 million in a new CD production plant that was to open that year.

2000s
By the 2000s, as per their advertisement in the November 30 issue of Billboard, the main studio could accommodate up to sixty musicians.

Recorded artists

Partial list
 Waves - Waves - 1975
 Gary Havoc & The Hurricanes - Havoc! - 1979
 Bill & Boyd - The very best of Bill & Boyd - 2003
 Royal New Zealand Navy Band - He Waita Moana (Ocean Songs) - 2014

Remastering, duplication etc
 The Yardmen -  Bricks And Mortar - (2010) (duplication)
 Ray Woolf - Ray Woolf - The Sixties Collection - 2012 (remastering)

References

Recording studios in New Zealand
Recording studios in Auckland, New Zealand
1970 establishments in New Zealand